Nina Buijsman (born 16 November 1997) is a Dutch racing cyclist, who currently rides for UCI Women's Continental Team .

Major results 
2021
 1st  Mountains classification Ladies Tour of Norway
2022
 9th Overall Belgium Tour

References

External links
 

1997 births
Living people
Dutch female cyclists
People from Stede Broec
Cyclists from North Holland
21st-century Dutch women